This a list of episodes for the anime Strawberry Marshmallow. The anime episodes are based on a Japanese manga series by manga creator Barasui about the cute adventures and the lives of Nobue Itoh, her younger sister Chika, and Chika's three friends. The list of episodes spans 12 TV episodes, 3 episodes from the Ichigo Mashimaro Original Video Animation series, followed by 2 episodes from the Ichigo Mashimaro encore OVA series. The episodes were all directed by Takuya Sato, who was also responsible for the series composition.  A brief (4 minute) episode was also produced to introduce the series and main characters.  In this episode, Nobue, her sister Chika, and her 3 friends are in a spaceship traveling for Earth when the ship's oxygen supply begins to leak.  Nobue, sensing there is enough oxygen for 4 people but not 5, sends Miu out in space (wearing a spacesuit, of course).  In retaliation for this act, Miu takes all the food, candy, and cigarettes with her when she's unceremoniously "booted out".

The opening for the anime television series is "Ichigo Complete", sung by Saeko Chiba, Fumiko Orikasa, Ayako Kawasumi, Mamiko Noto, and Hitomi Nabatame. The ending for the anime television series is "Classmate", sung by Miu's voice actress Fumiko Orikasa. The opening for the OVA series is "Akkan berry berry", also sung by Chiba, Orikasa, Kawasumi, Noto, and Nabatame. The ending for the OVA series is  sung by Orikasa. The ending for the Encore OVA is also sung by Orikasa and is titled .

Strawberry Marshmallow episodes
The animated series was first televised in Japan, then sold as DVDs in Japan and overseas.

Ichigo Mashimaro Original Video Animation episodes
The  series was released in Japan as DVDs after the TV series ended.

Ichigo Mashimaro encore episodes
The   was released in Japan as DVDs. This series followed Ichigo Mashimaro Original Video Animation.

References

Strawberry Marshmallow